Sarayjuq (also Romanized as Sarāyjūq; also known as Sarajūkh and Sarāyjoq) is a village in Mehraban-e Sofla Rural District, Gol Tappeh District, Kabudarahang County, Hamadan Province, Iran. At the 2006 census, its population was 701, in 156 families.

References 

Populated places in Kabudarahang County